As of June 2022, Italian airline Neos operates to the following destinations:

References

Lists of airline destinations